Mamuka Tavakalashvili or Tavakarashvili was a Georgian poet, painter and famous calligrapher of the 17th century at the court of the King of Imereti.

He was captured in Principality of Samegrelo in 1634 during the Georgian feudal fights when kings Teimuraz I of Kakheti and George III of Imereti waged war against King Rostom of Kartli and the Dadiani princes of Samegrelo. After this Mamuka worked as calligrapher at the court of Prince Levan II Dadiani.

In 1646 he copied The Knight in the Panther's Skin where he created 39 miniatures.

In 1647 Tavakalashvili also copied the Georgian translation of Shahnameh.

References
Georgian Soviet Encyclopedia, ტ. 4, გვ. 562, თბ., 1979
Korneli Kekelidze, ქართული ლიტერატურის ისტორია, ტ. 2, თბ., 1958;
ამირანაშვილი შ., ქართული ხელოვნების ისტორია, თბ., 1971;
ბარამიძე ა., ნარკვევები ქართული ლიტერატურის ისტორიიდან, ტ. 2, თბ., 1940;
ბერიძე ვ., ძველი ქართველი ოსტატები, თბ., 1967;
კობიძე დ., სპარსული ლიტერატურა, ნაწ. 2, თბ., 1947;
ყუბანეიშვილი ს., ლიტერატურული და ხალხური ზააქიანი, „საქართველოს სსრ მეცნიერებათა აკადემიის მოამბე“, 1953, თ. 14, № 6;
შერვაშიძე ლ., „ვეფხისტყაოსნის“ 1646 წლის ხელნაწერის მინიატურების ავტორობის შესახებ, იქვე, 1955, ტ. 16, № 6;

Calligraphers from Georgia (country)
17th-century people from Georgia (country)
17th-century poets from Georgia (country)
Painters from Georgia (country)
Manuscript illuminators
Male poets from Georgia (country)
17th-century male writers